il Napoli is an Italian local newspaper owned by the San Marino-based publishing company E Polis and based in Naples, Italy. 
	
Although it is not a free newspaper, 70% of copies are distributed free near very busy locations like universities, railway stations and airports, shopping centres and is regularly sold at newsstands.

2006 establishments in Italy
Italian-language newspapers
Newspapers published in Naples
Publications established in 2006
Daily newspapers published in Italy